is a Japanese speed skater. She competed in the women's 3000 metres at the 2018 Winter Olympics. Sato was part of the Japanese team that won the 2018 Olympics women team pursuit gold medal.

See also
 List of world records in speed skating
 World record progression team pursuit speed skating women
 List of Olympic records in speed skating

References

External links

1996 births
Living people
Japanese female speed skaters
Olympic speed skaters of Japan
Speed skaters at the 2018 Winter Olympics
Speed skaters at the 2022 Winter Olympics
Medalists at the 2018 Winter Olympics
Medalists at the 2022 Winter Olympics
People from Kushiro, Hokkaido
Olympic medalists in speed skating
Olympic gold medalists for Japan
Olympic silver medalists for Japan
Speed skaters at the 2017 Asian Winter Games
Asian Games medalists in speed skating
Medalists at the 2017 Asian Winter Games
Asian Games gold medalists for Japan
Asian Games silver medalists for Japan
Asian Games bronze medalists for Japan
World Single Distances Speed Skating Championships medalists
21st-century Japanese women